Aveline's Hole is a cave at Burrington Combe in the limestone of the Mendip Hills, in Somerset, England.

The earliest scientifically dated cemetery in Britain, 10,200 and 10,400 years old, was found at Aveline's Hole, constituting the largest assemblage of Mesolithic human remains found in Britain. Much of the collection has been lost due to pillaging, poorly recorded investigation and war, and although more than fifty individuals are represented, there are only two complete skeletons. Perforated animal teeth, red ochre and seven pieces of fossil ammonite, suggest that some of the bodies were adorned.

A series of inscribed crosses found on the wall of the Aveline's Hole cave are believed to date from the early Mesolithic period just after the Ice Age. The pattern is said to be comparable with others known from Northern France, Germany and Denmark. A gate has been installed in the cave to protect the engraving, after consultations between English Heritage and other interested parties, including the landowner and English Nature.

The cave was rediscovered in 1797 by two men digging for a rabbit. The cave was excavated and the entrance enlarged in 1860 by William Boyd Dawkins who named it after his mentor William Talbot Aveline.

Access to the cave is controlled by the University of Bristol Spelæological Society and is restricted during the bat hibernation season.

See also 
 Caves of the Mendip Hills

References

External links 
 

Caves of the Mendip Hills
Limestone caves
Archaeological sites in England
Scheduled monuments in North Somerset